Karol Robak (born 24 August 1997, Poznań) is a Polish taekwondo athlete.

He competed at the 2016 Summer Olympics in Rio de Janeiro, in the men's 68 kg.

References

External links

1997 births
Living people
Polish male taekwondo practitioners
Olympic taekwondo practitioners of Poland
Taekwondo practitioners at the 2016 Summer Olympics
Sportspeople from Poznań
Taekwondo practitioners at the 2015 European Games
European Games medalists in taekwondo
European Games silver medalists for Poland
European Taekwondo Championships medalists
21st-century Polish people